The  San Antonio Talons season was the 14th season for the franchise, the fifth in the Arena Football League, and the third in San Antonio, Texas. The team was coached by Lee Johnson and played their home games at the Alamodome. Finishing the regular season with a 3–15 record, this was the worst season in franchise history.

Standings

Schedule
The Talons began the season at home against the Los Angeles Kiss on March 15. Their last regular season game was on the road against the New Orleans VooDoo on July 26.

Roster

References

San Antonio Talons
San Antonio Talons
San Antonio Talons seasons